Nembrotha cristata is a species of colourful sea slug, a polycerid nudibranch, a marine gastropod mollusk in the family Polyceridae. This species of sea slug is black with green markings; adults are around 50 mm in length, and they live on rock or coral reefs in the tropical Indo-West Pacific Ocean.

Description
Nembrotha cristata is a large black nembrothine ("nembrothid" in much of the literature) that grows to at least 50 mm in length. Its body is covered with raised green nodules. The rhinophores and gills are black, edged in green. Other than the difference in colour, this species is similar in appearance to Nembrotha yonowae.

Distribution
This nudibranch species was described from the Philippines. It occurs in the tropical Indo-West Pacific Ocean. It lives at depths between three and twenty metres. These sea slugs live on coral or rock reefs, and have a lifespan of up to a year.

Behaviour
The bright colours of this nudibranch species are an aposematic warning to predators. These sea slugs eat compound tunicates. Like all opisthobranchs, they are hermaphrodites.

References

External links
 

 Photographs at Sea Slugs of the Mediterranean Sea and Elsewhere
 Video - Taken in Bali, Indonesia

Polyceridae
Gastropods described in 1877